The Tournament Players Championship was a professional golf tournament on the European Tour from 1977 to 1984. It was founded as a direct replacement to the Piccadilly Medal tournament. Except in the first two years the official name took the form "[Sponsor's name] TPC". It was played in either England or Scotland. Having started as one of the richest events on the tour, it had below average prize money in later years.

Winners of the Tournament Players Championship included two major champions, Nick Faldo of England and Bernhard Langer of Germany.

Since the demise of the Tournament Players Championship, the TPC moniker has also been applied to the Lawrence Batley International T.P.C. in 1986, the Portuguese Open TPC in 1989 and 1990, and the Deutsche Bank Open TPC of Europe in Germany from 1995 to 2007. "Tournament Players Championship" was also the original name of the PGA Tour's Players Championship, which is the richest event on that tour

Winners

References

External links
Coverage on the European Tour's official site

Former European Tour events
Golf tournaments in the United Kingdom
Recurring sporting events established in 1977
Recurring events disestablished in 1984
1977 establishments in the United Kingdom
1984 disestablishments in the United Kingdom